Juan José Miguez (1918–1995) was an Argentine actor. He appeared in more than thirty films during his career including co-starring alongside Eva Perón in The Prodigal (1946) during the Golden Age of Argentine Cinema. Later in his career he appeared several times in Isabel Sarli films. Miguez also appeared frequently on the television, stage and radio. He was married to the actress Lia Casanova.

Selected filmography
 Three Men of the River (1943)
El Fin de la Noche (1944)
 The Circus Cavalcade (1945)
 The Prodigal (1946)
 Musical Romance (1947)
 Santos Vega Returns (1947)
 Juan Mondiola (1950)
 Valentina (1950)
 Emergency Ward (1952)
Plaza Huincul (Pozo Uno) (1960)
The Horny Days (1973)
 A Butterfly in the Night (1977)

References

Bibliography 
 Mizraje, María Gabriela. Argentinas de Rosas a Perón. Editorial Biblos, 1999.

External links 
 

1918 births
1995 deaths
Argentine male film actors
20th-century Argentine male actors